Madval, sometimes also known as Dhobi, is a washerman community of Goa and rest of the Konkan. They claim to be Rajakas.The occupation of washermen is hereditary. The services of washermen are essential for the people of the urban as well as rural areas alike. They have their own localities which are sometimes gifted to them by the temples for the services they render and agriculture farmers.

Notes

Hinduism in Goa
Social groups of Goa